North Star is a census-designated place (CDP) in New Castle County, Delaware, United States. The population was 7,980 at the 2010 census.

Geography
North Star is located at  (39.7612226, -75.7191006).

Demographics

At the 2000 census there were 8,277 people, 2,629 households, and 2,408 families living in the CDP. The racial makeup of the CDP was 89.60% White, 2.50% African American, 0.07% Native American, 6.68% Asian, 0.02% Pacific Islander, 0.30% from other races, and 0.82% from two or more races. Hispanic or Latino of any race were 1.17%.

Of the 2,629 households 49.9% had children under the age of 18 living with them, 87.3% were married couples living together, 2.9% had a female householder with no husband present, and 8.4% were non-families. 6.8% of households were one person and 1.9% were one person aged 65 or older.  The average household size was 3.15 and the average family size was 3.30.

The age distribution was 31.4% under the age of 18, 5.0% from 18 to 24, 27.4% from 25 to 44, 30.7% from 45 to 64, and 5.4% 65 or older.  The median age was 39 years. For every 100 females, there were 99.3 males.  For every 100 females age 18 and over, there were 98.7 males.

The median household income was $110,616 and the median family income  was $113,621. Males had a median income of $81,175 versus $46,603 for females. The per capita income for the CDP was $39,677.  About 2.2% of families and 2.4% of the population were below the poverty line, including 3.3% of those under age 18 and none of those age 65 or over.

Education 
North Star is divided between the Red Clay Consolidated School District and the Christina School District.

In all of the Red Clay area, North Star Elementary is the zoned elementary school, and H. B. duPont Middle School is the zoned middle school. In portions of the Red Clay area zoned high schools include John Dickinson High School, and Alexis I. duPont High School.

The Christina portion is zoned to Maclary Elementary School, Shue/Medill Middle School, and Newark High School. Previously Grades 5-6 were assigned to Bancroft Intermediate School in Wilmington.

Notable Places 
North Star contains Woodside Farm Creamery and the Chinese American Community Center.

References

Census-designated places in New Castle County, Delaware
Census-designated places in Delaware